SCM Estate was established in 2006 for the management of the property assets of financial and industrial Ukrainian holding - SCM Group. From the beginning of 2008, the company was renamed ESTA Holding. The company is 100% owned by SCM Group. Key areas of ESTA business are:
 Investment
 Development of commercial and residential properties of premium class
 Hospitality business
 Real estate operation and management

ESTA Holding key assets:
 Pushkinskiy complex, Donetsk
 Opera Hotel, Kyiv
 Leonardo business centre, Kyiv
 Logistics centre, Dnipro
 Donbass Palace Hotel, Donetsk
 Kyiv Hotel, Donetsk
 Kyivskyy Central Department store (TsUM), Kyiv

The Chief Executive Officer is Nikolay Nesterenko. As of 2011, ESTA Holding is going to invest more than $500m in the development of new projects over the next five years. ESTA Holding makes substantial investments in the expansion of its assets' portfolio, which already exceeds $300 million. The latest acquisitions include the purchase of the Kiev Central Department Store and of the Donetsk-based “Kiev” hotel which after the current reconstruction will be launched under Park Inn by Radisson brand.

See also
SCM Holdings
The Leading Hotels of the World

References

External links
  SCM Holdings official website
 ESTA Holding official website

SCM Holdings
Real estate companies of Ukraine
Companies based in Donetsk
Companies based in Kyiv
Ukrainian companies established in 2006